Ernest Eugene Charles Augustus Bernard Paul of Hesse-Philippsthal (born: 20 December 1846 in Philippsthal; died: 22 December 1925 in Eisenach) was a member of the House of Hesse and was the last ruling Landgrave of Hesse-Philippsthal.

Life 
Ernst was the eldest son of the Landgrave Charles II of Hesse-Philippsthal (1803-1868) from his marriage to Duchess Marie of Württemberg (1818-1888), a daughter of Duke Eugen of Württemberg.

After the Electorate of Hesse including Hesse-Philippsthal was annexed by Prussia in 1866, Ernest resigned on all subsequent claims on Hesse-Philippsthal in 1868, together with Landgrave Alexis of Hesse-Philippsthal-Barchfeld.

Ernest died in 1925 unmarried and without descendants.  With his death, the main Hesse-Philippsthal line of the House of Hesse died out; only the junior lines Hesse-Philippsthal-Barchfeld and Hesse-Kassel-Rumpenheim remained; the first inherited his estate.

Ancestors

External links 
Hessen-Philippsthal, in: Meyers Konversations-Lexikon, 1888

Members of the Prussian House of Lords
House of Hesse
1846 births
1925 deaths
Landgraves of Hesse
19th-century German people
20th-century German people
Heirs apparent who never acceded
Sons of monarchs